Gariahater Ganglords is a Bengali web series streaming on Bengali OTT platform hoichoi. The series is directed by Atreyee Sen and Produced by SVF. It is a story which includes a slightly dark tone which reflects what actually happening in the underworld. Gariahater Ganglords is a story of comedy of errors that revolving around a young wannabe gang lord called Johny and his blind-and-partly-deaf partner Bunty. Everything was going fine unless Johny’s young cousin Buchku came from Malda. Buchku moves in with the gangster duo, filling their lives with a blend of his naivety, stupidity, and wildness. As the comic gangsters live together, it leads to a series of unlucky yet hilarious incidents. The Series starring Saurav Das, Anindita Bose, Ayan Bhattacharjee, Debmalya Gupta in central characters. Hoichoi also released a song from this web series named ‘Gorom Gorilla’ which features Kanchan Mallick.

Cast 
Saurav Das
Anindita Bose
Ayan Bhattacharjee
Debmalya Gupta

Season 1 (2018)
The series started streaming worldwide on hoichoi from 13 January 2018 with 10 episodes.

Episodes

References

External links

Indian web series
2017 web series debuts
Bengali-language web series
Hoichoi original programming